Vanessa Anne Baker (born 12 June 1974) is a former Australian diver. 

Born in Sydney, Australia Baker was educated at MLC Burwood.

She competed at the 1990 Commonwealth Games in the 10 metre platform event and finished tenth. In the 1994 Commonwealth Games she competed in two events. In the 3 metre springboard event she finished fourth, while in the 10 metre platform she came eighth.

She competed at the 1996 Atlanta Olympics in the 10 metre platform event where she finished 25th of 33.

References 

1974 births
Living people
Australian female divers
Divers at the 1996 Summer Olympics
Olympic divers of Australia
20th-century Australian women
21st-century Australian women